Bob Malvagna in an American college baseball coach and former player. Malvanga played college baseball at St. John's University from 1975 to 1979 for head coach Joe Russo. He served as head baseball coach for the New York Institute of Technology from 2013 to 2018.

Malvagna played for St. John's from 1975 through 1979, and appeared in the 1978 College World Series with the Redmen. In 2001, Malvagna became an assistant coach at Adelphi, serving as hitting and third base coach and later adding associate head coach duties.  He helped lead the Panthers to five winning seasons and a pair of NCAA Division II regional appearances.  In 2011, Malvagna served as an assistant at Nassau Community College in East Garden City, New York.  He spent the 2012 season at Queensborough Community College before being hired as head coach of the Bears in 2013.

Head coaching record

References

External links
List of current NCAA Division I baseball coaches

Living people
Adelphi Panthers baseball coaches
Nassau Lions baseball coaches
NYIT Bears baseball coaches
Queensborough Tigers baseball coaches
St. John's Red Storm baseball players
New York Institute of Technology faculty
Year of birth missing (living people)